Igor Jančevski (Macedonian and Serbian: Игор Јанчевски) (born 16 September 1974 in Zemun) is a Macedonian retired football midfielder.

Club career
He finished his career at Čelik Zenica in the Premier League of Bosnia and Herzegovina. He could also play as a defensive midfielder and was part of the Macedonia national team squad.

International career
He made his senior debut for Macedonia in a February 2003 friendly match against Croatia and has earned a total of 28 caps, scoring no goals. His final international was a February 2008 friendly against Serbia.

References

External links

Profile at MacedonianFootball.com 
UEFA EURO 2008 player statistics
Macedonian team history, BBC.

1974 births
Living people
People from Zemun
Macedonian people of Serbian descent
Serbian people of Macedonian descent
Association football midfielders
Macedonian footballers
North Macedonia international footballers
Partizán Bardejov players
SV Waldhof Mannheim players
NK Brotnjo players
NK Varaždin players
Diyarbakırspor footballers
Hapoel Nof HaGalil F.C. players
Enosis Neon Paralimni FC players
NK Čelik Zenica players
Slovak Super Liga players
Regionalliga players
Challenger Pro League players
Premier League of Bosnia and Herzegovina players
Croatian Football League players
Süper Lig players
Israeli Premier League players
Cypriot First Division players
Macedonian expatriate footballers
Expatriate footballers in Slovakia
Macedonian expatriate sportspeople in Slovakia
Expatriate footballers in Germany
Macedonian expatriate sportspeople in Germany
Expatriate footballers in Belgium
Macedonian expatriate sportspeople in Belgium
Expatriate footballers in Bosnia and Herzegovina
Macedonian expatriate sportspeople in Bosnia and Herzegovina
Expatriate footballers in Croatia
Macedonian expatriate sportspeople in Croatia
Expatriate footballers in Turkey
Macedonian expatriate sportspeople in Turkey
Expatriate footballers in Israel
Macedonian expatriate sportspeople in Israel
Expatriate footballers in Cyprus
Macedonian expatriate sportspeople in Cyprus